Lake Benton or Benton Lake may refer to a place in the United States:

Cities, towns, and townships
Lake Benton, Minnesota, a small city in Lincoln County
Lake Benton Township, Lincoln County, Minnesota

Lakes
Lake Benton (Lincoln County, Minnesota)
Lake Benton, the official first name of the Lake of the Ozarks
Benton Lake, Montana, a lake within Benton Lake National Wildlife Refuge
Benton Lake, Minnesota, a lake within Carver County, Minnesota